Udea praepetalis is a moth in the family Crambidae. It was described by Julius Lederer in 1869. It is found in Iran and Turkey.

References

praepetalis
Moths described in 1869